Nicolas Kiefer was the defending champion but did not compete that year.

Marcelo Ríos won in the final 7–6 (7–3), 6–2 against Rainer Schüttler.

Seeds
A champion seed is indicated in bold text while text in italics indicates the round in which that seed was eliminated.

  Juan Carlos Ferrero (quarterfinals)
  Marat Safin (second round)
  Sébastien Grosjean (quarterfinals)
  Andy Roddick (first round)
  Mark Philippoussis (second round)
  Jonas Björkman (quarterfinals)
  Michael Chang (second round)
  Marcelo Ríos (champion)

Draw

References
 2001 Salem Open Draw

Hong Kong Open (tennis)
Singles